William Steel was a Scottish professional golfer. He finished in eighth place in the 1860 Open Championship.

Early life
Steel was born in Scotland circa 1840.

Golf career

1860 Open Championship
The 1860 Open Championship was a golf competition held at Prestwick Golf Club, in Ayrshire, Scotland. It is now regarded as the first Open Championship. Eight golfers contested the event, with Willie Park, Sr. winning the championship by 2 shots from Tom Morris, Sr. Steel's round-by-round scores are unknown, although his total for 3 rounds of play was 232, as the event was 3 rounds of 12 holes.

Death
Steel's date of death is unknown.

References

Scottish male golfers